Arltunga is a deserted gold rush town located  in the Northern Territory of Australia in the locality of Hart about  east of Alice Springs. It is of major historical significance as the first major European settlement in Central Australia.

Early Indigenous history

The Karolinga and Aldolanda people, now known as the East Aranda people are thought to have occupied the Arltunga and surrounding region for up to 20,000 years. An early map drawn by TGH Strehlow identifies at least thirty significant cultural sites in the region surrounding Arltunga, including water sources that would have supported early mining in the region. While much mythological ceremonial information remains sacred, it is widely known that the Kulaia serpent inhabits all places containing water. When Strehlow camped just south of Arltunga in 1935, he recorded other Eastern Aranda kangaroo, native cat and rain ceremonies and songs. While most of the East Aranda people left the region in 1953 upon the establishment of the Santa Teresa Mission, they returned regularly for ceremonies well into the 1970s. Rock carvings and artifacts have been found in the Arltunga area, particularly near Paddy's Rock-Hole, Akura-ala Waterhole and the Joker's Mine Area and Gorge.

Mining
Gold was observed by South Australian explorer, David Lindsay in 1887 as he trekked from Port Darwin to the coast of South Australia. Subsequently, miners flocked to the area and Arltunga became the first substantial European settlement in Central Australia. The town was kept alive for a while after the initial gold rush when the South Australian Government built the Government Battery and Cyanide Works in 1898.  Construction was supervised by James Gilbert Woolcock, who had to overcome significant logistical problems.  With the Battery's closure in 1916, the population declined to 25 by 1933.

Mission
A mission for Aboriginal people called the Sacred Heart Mission was established at Arltunga in 1935 by Father P. Moloney. It was moved to a more 'suitable' site at Phillipson's Block (Santa Teresa) southeast of Alice Springs in 1952.

Recent history
Arltunga Historical Reserve was established in 1975 and comprises 5,000 ha. Owing to the harshness of the climate and the fact that local stone was used in the construction of buildings, the town is well preserved.

The reserve was nominated for heritage listing in 2008. While the Government Battery and Cyanide Works site at Arltunga was successfully listed in 1995, the nomination for the rest of the reserve was unresolved due to a native title claim in the area until 2014, when a second nomination was successful.

The reserve was listed on the former Register of the National Estate.

Notable people
Bushman, Ben Nicker, was born just north of the Arltunga goldfields.

References 

Historical reserves of the Northern Territory
Ghost towns in the Northern Territory
Mining in the Northern Territory
Gold mines in Australia
Australian Aboriginal missions
Northern Territory places listed on the defunct Register of the National Estate